Pungi Daasa is a 2014 Indian Kannada comedy drama directed by M. S. Sreenath. It is a comedy about how the Pungi Daasa tries to recover the money his grandfather had lent to various people after his grandfather goes into a coma.

Cast 

 Komal Kumar as Ramadasa
 Asma as Nandini
 Sowcar Janaki as Gayatri Devi
 B. C. Patil as elder son of Devadasa's first wife
 R. N. Sudarshan as Devadasa
 Tabla Nani as Ramadasa's uncle
 Rajendra Karanth as Kalidasa
 Padmaja Rao as Kalidasa's mother
 Asif as younger son of Devadasa's first wife
 Bullet Prakash
 Kuri Prathap as Ramadasa's friend
 Honnavalli Krishna
 Chikkanna as Ramadasa's friend
 M. S. Umesh
 Rockline Sudhakar
 Mukhyamantri Chandru as judge and Kalidasa's close friend
 H. G. Dattatreya Devadasa's close friend
 Akki Channabasappa

Soundtrack

References

2014 films
2010s Kannada-language films
Indian comedy films
2014 comedy films